The Masters of the Ancient Wisdom are claimed to be enlightened beings originally identified by the Theosophists Helena Blavatsky, Henry S. Olcott, Alfred Percy Sinnett, and others. These Theosophists claimed to have met some of The Masters during their lifetimes in different parts of the world. Sometimes they are referred to by Theosophists as Elder Brothers of the Human Race, Adepts, Mahatmas, or simply as The Masters.

Helena Blavatsky was the first person to introduce the concept of the Masters to the West. At first she talked about them privately, but she stated that after a few years two of these adepts, Kuthumi (K.H.) and Morya (M.), agreed to maintain a correspondence with two British Theosophists–Alfred P. Sinnett and A. O. Hume. This communication took place from 1880 to 1885, and during those years the reputed existence and objectives of the Mahatmas became public. The original letters are currently kept in the British Library in London and have been published as the Mahatma Letters.

After Blavatsky's death, the Masters of the Ancient Wisdom were talked about, in more or less modified form from the original conception, by people who at some point had had a connection with the Theosophical movement, such as Alice Bailey, Helena Roerich, and Manly P. Hall.

Overview

H.P. Blavatsky 
The founder of the Theosophical Society, Helena Blavatsky, in the late 19th century brought attention to the idea of secret initiatory knowledge, by claiming her ideas were based on traditions taught to her by a group of highly enlightened yogis which she called the Mahatmas or Masters of the Ancient Wisdom. These Mahatmas, she claimed, were physical beings living in the Himalayas, usually understood as Tibet:

Annie Besant and C.W. Leadbeater 
After Blavatsky's death, Annie Besant and Charles W. Leadbeater described the Masters in great detail. In Leadbeater's book, The Masters and the Path (1925), the Masters are presented as human beings full of wisdom and compassion, albeit still limited by human bodies, which they choose to retain in order to keep in touch with humanity and help in its evolution.

Alice Bailey and Benjamin Creme 
Alice Bailey and later Benjamin Creme claimed in total fourty-nine Masters of the Ancient Wisdom are actively involved in helping the human evolution. Bailey claimed the Master Djwal Khul (D.K.) to be the (telepathic) source of her books on esoteric philosophy.

Skeptical view
K. Paul Johnson suggests in his book The Masters Revealed: Madame Blavatsky and Myth of the Great White Lodge that the Masters that Madame Blavatsky claimed she had personally met are idealizations of certain people she had met during her lifetime.

See also 

 Ascended master
 Alice Bailey
 Helena Petrovna Blavatsky
 Benjamin Creme
 Hodgson Report
 Initiation (Theosophy)
 K.H. Letters to C.W. Leadbeater
 Mahātmā
 Helena Roerich
 Theosophy

References

Further reading
 Brendan, J.F. The Theosophical Masters: An Investigation into the Conceptual Domains of, H. P. Blavatsky and C. W. Leadbeater 2000: University of Sydney. Vol. 1 and Vol. 2.
 Campbell, Bruce F. A History of the Theosophical Movement Berkeley:1980 University of California Press
 Godwin, Joscelyn The Theosophical Enlightenment Albany, New York: 1994 State University of New York Press
 Johnson, K. Paul The Masters Revealed: Madam Blavatsky and Myth of the Great White Brotherhood Albany, New York: 1994 State University of New York Press
 Melton, J. Gordon Encyclopedia of American Religions 5th Edition New York:1996 Gale Research  ISSN 1066-1212 Chapter 18--"The Ancient Wisdom Family of Religions" Pages 151-158; see chart on page 154 listing Masters of the Ancient Wisdom; Also see Section 18, Pages 717-757 Descriptions of various Ancient Wisdom religious organizations
 Sender, Pablo Mahatmas versus Ascended Masters Wheaton, Il:Quest Summer 2011, The Theosophical Society in America. Online access.

 
Esoteric cosmology
Theosophy
Theosophical philosophical concepts